Clathrina broenstedi is a species of calcareous sponge from the Weddell Sea. The species is named after Holger Brøndsted, a Danish sponge researcher. The only spicules present in this species are triactines.

References

World Register of Marine Species entry

Clathrina
Fauna of Antarctica
Animals described in 2011